is a Japanese actor and entertainer who also works as a vocalist in his solo project, Ash Berry. He graduated from Tokyo Metropolitan Kōhoku High School. He has an exclusive contract with GF Enterprise.

Biography
Kishida passed an audition in March 1997, and appeared in Waratte Iitomo! until March 2000.

He also appeared in variety shows such as London Hearts and Back Up!

As an actor, Kishida made regular appearances in the drama series O Mizu no Hanamichi and Sutā no Koi.

Filmography

TV series

Past performances
Variety series

Dramas

Films

References

External links
 
 Kensaku Kishida at Wiki Informer

Japanese male actors
Japanese entertainers
1978 births
Living people
People from Tokyo